Julia Kykkänen (born 17 April 1994) is a Finnish ski jumper who has competed since 2010. She was the first Finnish female ski jumper to compete in the Ski Jumping World Championships, during the 2009 event in Liberec. At World Cup level her best finish is third on two occasions, in Hinzenbach on 2 February 2014 and in Falun on 15 March 2014, as well as eight additional top-10 finishes.

Standings

Junior World Championships
32. in Zakopane, Poland, 2008
22. in Strbske Pleso, Slovakia, 2009
23. in Hinterzarten, Germany, 2010
17. in Otepää, Estonia, 2011
8. in Erzurum, Turkey, 2012

World Championships
26. in Liberec, Czech Republic, 2009
17. in Oslo, Norway, 2011
10 in Predazzo, Italy, 2013

Ski jumping Continental Cup
46. in Bischofsgün, Germany, August 12, 2007
36. in Pöhla Germany, August 15, 2007
45. in Bischofshofen, Austria, August 18, 2007
44. in Ramsau, Austria, August 19, 2007
27. in Notodden, Norway, December 11, 2007
17. in Notodden, Norway, December 12, 2007
17. in Zao, Japan, March 8, 2008
21. in Zao, Japan, March 9, 2008
3. in Lillehammer, Norway, September 8, 2009

Ski jumping World Cup
14. in Lillehammer, Norway, December 3, 2011
15. in Predazzo, Italy, January 14, 2012
15. in Hinzenbach, Austria, February 5, 2012

References

1994 births
Living people
Sportspeople from Lahti
Finnish female ski jumpers
Olympic ski jumpers of Finland
Ski jumpers at the 2014 Winter Olympics
Ski jumpers at the 2018 Winter Olympics
Ski jumpers at the 2022 Winter Olympics
Universiade medalists in ski jumping
Universiade silver medalists for Finland
Competitors at the 2013 Winter Universiade